Chloé Trespeuch (born 13 April 1994) is a French snowboarder competing in snowboard cross.

She qualified for the 2014 Winter Olympics in Sochi and won the bronze medal in the snowboard cross.

At the 2022 Winter Olympics she won the silver medal, in Women's snowboard cross.

References

External links 

 
 
 
 
 

1994 births
Living people
French female snowboarders
Olympic snowboarders of France
Snowboarders at the 2014 Winter Olympics
Snowboarders at the 2018 Winter Olympics
Snowboarders at the 2022 Winter Olympics
Olympic silver medalists for France
Olympic bronze medalists for France
Medalists at the 2014 Winter Olympics
Medalists at the 2022 Winter Olympics
Olympic medalists in snowboarding
Université Savoie-Mont Blanc alumni
Knights of the Ordre national du Mérite
Universiade medalists in snowboarding
People from Bourg-Saint-Maurice
Sportspeople from Savoie
Universiade silver medalists for France
Competitors at the 2015 Winter Universiade
21st-century French women